Bring It On! is the 52nd studio album by American musician James Brown. The album belongs in the Funk/Soul genre and was released in 1983, by Churchill/ Augusta Sound in US. It was released in an LP format as a vinyl album. The songs were recorded with Jimmy Nola, Arthur Dickson, and J.B,'s Internationals.

Credits 
The album's Producer is James Brown, Art Director is Sherman Brooks, and Photographer was done by Gina Halsey.

Track listing

References

1983 albums
James Brown albums
Albums produced by James Brown